Eupithecia conviva is a moth in the family Geometridae. It is found in Turkmenistan.

References

Moths described in 1903
conviva
Moths of Asia